Forest Lake or Forest Lakes may refer to:

Places

Australia
 Forest Lake, Queensland, Australia, a planned community in Brisbane

New Zealand
 Forest Lake, New Zealand, a suburb of Hamilton
 Forest Lakes, Wellington, a rural locality

United States
 Forest Lakes, Arizona
 Forest Lake (Arkansas), a lake in Garland County, Arkansas
 Forest Lake, Illinois, a census-designated place in Lake County
 Forest Lake, Michigan, an unincorporated community in Alger County
 Forest Lake, Minnesota, a city in Washington County
 Forest Lake Camp, a summer camp in upstate New York
 Forest Lake Resort, a former resort in Lake County, California
 Forest Lake Township, Washington County, Minnesota
 Forest Lake Township, Susquehanna County, Pennsylvania

Schools 
 Forest Lake Academy, Orlando, Florida, USA
 Forest Lake College, Queensland, Australia
 Forest Lake State High School, Queensland, Australia